IEEE Transactions on Pattern Analysis and Machine Intelligence (sometimes abbreviated as IEEE PAMI or simply PAMI) is a monthly peer-reviewed scientific journal published by the IEEE Computer Society.

Background 
The journal covers research in computer vision and image understanding, pattern analysis and recognition, machine intelligence, machine learning, search techniques, document and handwriting analysis, medical image analysis, video and image sequence analysis, content-based retrieval of image and video, and face and gesture recognition. The editor-in-chief is Kyoung Mu Lee (Seoul National University). According to the Journal Citation Reports, the journal has a 2021 impact factor of 24.314.

References

External links

Transactions on Pattern Analysis and Machine Intelligence
Computer science journals
Artificial intelligence publications
Monthly journals
Publications established in 1979
English-language journals